The 1976–77 San Diego Mariners season was the third and final season of operation of the San Diego Mariners of the World Hockey Association (WHA). The Mariners finished third in the Western Division and qualified for the playoffs, losing in the first round to the Winnipeg Jets.

Offseason

Regular season

Final standings

Game log

Playoffs

Winnipeg Jets 4, San Diego Mariners 3

Player stats

Note: Pos = Position; GP = Games played; G = Goals; A = Assists; Pts = Points; +/- = plus/minus; PIM = Penalty minutes; PPG = Power-play goals; SHG = Short-handed goals; GWG = Game-winning goals
      MIN = Minutes played; W = Wins; L = Losses; T = Ties; GA = Goals-against; GAA = Goals-against average; SO = Shutouts;

Awards and records

Transactions

Draft picks
San Diego's draft picks at the 1976 WHA Amateur Draft.

Farm teams

See also
1976–77 WHA season

References

External links

San
San
San Diego Mariners seasons